Glen E. Morrell (born May 26, 1936) is a retired United States Army soldier who served as the seventh Sergeant Major of the Army. He was sworn in on July 1, 1983, and served until July 1987.

Early life
Morrell was born in Wick, West Virginia, on May 26, 1936.

Military career
Morrell served in the United States Army for over 32 years. After his entry on active duty in November 1954 he served in virtually every non-commissioned officer leadership position. His career took him through many assignments across the United States, two tours in Europe, three tours in the Republic of Vietnam and two tours in Panama. Morrell attended Ranger School at Fort Benning, Georgia at the age of forty-one and was selected as the Distinguished Honor Graduate for his class.

Morrell's units of assignment include the 6th Infantry in Berlin; 14th Armored Cavalry Regiment, Germany; 82d Airborne Division, Fort Bragg, North Carolina; 5th Special Forces Group at Fort Bragg, North Carolina, and three tours in the Republic of Vietnam; two tours with the 7th and 8th Special Forces Group, Panama; 1st Infantry Division, Fort Riley, Kansas; Reserve Officer Training Corps instructor duty with Saint John's University, Minnesota; 1st Ranger Battalion, 75th Infantry, Fort Stewart, Georgia, Special Forces Detachment (Airborne) Europe; United States Army Recruiting Command, Fort Sheridan, Illinois; and the United States Army Forces Command, Fort McPherson, Georgia.

The US Army Recruiting Command established the Glen E. Morrell Award for Recruiting Excellence in his honor. This medallion is the ultimate award under the Recruiting Incentive Awards Program. It includes a medallion that the recipient wears as part of their Army uniform. In addition to the medallion, a ring and a certificate for the recruiter (and the recruiter's spouse, if applicable) will be awarded.

Awards and decorations

References

The Sergeants Major of the Army,  Daniel K. Elder, Center of Military History, United States Army Washington, D.C. 2003.

1936 births
Living people
Recipients of the Distinguished Service Medal (US Army)
United States Army personnel of the Vietnam War
People from Tyler County, West Virginia
Sergeants Major of the Army
United States Army Sergeants Major Academy alumni
Recipients of the Meritorious Service Medal (United States)